South Korea competed at the 1992 Winter Paralympics in Tignes/Albertville, France. Two competitors from South Korea won no medals and therefore did not place in the medal table.

See also 
 South Korea at the Paralympics
 South Korea at the 1992 Winter Olympics

References 

South Korea at the Paralympics
1992 in South Korean sport
Nations at the 1992 Winter Paralympics